Paul Boll (born 13 November 1986) is a German ice dancer. With former partner Tanja Kolbe, he is the 2006 German junior national champion and placed 16th at the 2006 World Junior Championships.

Earlier in his career, Boll skated with Rina Thieleke, Ksenia Antonova and Maureen Ibanez. He ended his competitive career in 2009 and became a coach in spring 2009. He coaches Ria Schiffner / Julian Salatzki and has choreographed for Paul Fentz and Mari-Doris Vartmann / Aaron Van Cleave.

Programs 
(with Kolbe)

Results
(with Kolbe)

References

External links 

 

German male ice dancers
Figure skaters from Berlin
1986 births
Living people